Maulvi Inamullah Habibi Samangani (مولوي انعام الله سمنګاني) is an Afghan Taliban politician who is currently serving as Deputy Central Spokesman of the Islamic Emirate of Afghanistan alongside Ahmadullah Wasiq and Maulvi Asadullah (Bilal Karimi) since 25 October 2021. He is also a member of the Taliban cultural commission.

He is an ethnic Tajik.

In October 2021 he visited Uzbekistan with a delegation led by the Second Deputy Prime Minister, Abdul Salam Hanafi.

References

Year of birth missing (living people)
Living people
Taliban spokespersons
Afghan Tajik people